The Texas Institute of Letters is a non-profit Honor Society founded by William Harvey Vann in 1936 to celebrate Texas literature and to recognize distinctive literary achievement. The TIL’s elected membership consists of the state’s most respected writers of fiction, nonfiction, poetry, journalism, and scholarship. Induction into the TIL is based on literary accomplishments. Application for membership is not accepted. The rules governing the selection of members and officers are contained in the TIL By-Laws. The TIL annually elects new members, gives awards to recognize outstanding literary works, and supports the Dobie Paisano Fellowship Program for writers.

The TIL offers awards to outstanding books written by Texas authors, or dealing with Texas subjects. The TIL also co-administrates the Dobie Paisano Fellowship, which awards residencies at the ranch of former TIL President J. Frank Dobie.

Each year the TIL awards over $26,000 in literary prizes, including the Jesse H. Jones Award for Best Book of Fiction, the Carr P. Collins Award for Best Book of Nonfiction, the Sergio Troncoso Award for Best First Book Fiction, the Ramirez Family Award for Most Significant Scholarly Book, the Helen C. Smith Award for Best Book of Poetry, the John A. Robertson Award For Best First Book of Poetry, Jean Flynn Award for Best Young Adult Book, Deirdre Siobhan FlynnBass Award for Best Middle Grade Book, Brigid Erin Flynn Award for Best Picture Book, the Edwin "Bud" Shrake Award for Best Short Nonfiction, the Kay Cattarulla Award for Best Short Story, the Fred Whitehead Award for Design of a Trade Book (biennial), and the Soeurette Diehl Fraser Award for Best Translation of a Book (biennial).

The TIL website has a  complete list of all the winners from every prize category starting from 1936 to present.

Prominent members include: Sarah Bird, Sandra Cisneros, Elizabeth Crook, Robert Flynn, Ben Fountain, Stephen Harrigan, Skip Hollandsworth, Cormac McCarthy, Larry McMurtry, Pat Mora, Rick Riordan, Naomi Shihab Nye, Benjamin Alire Sáenz, George Saunders, Cynthia Leitich Smith, W. K. Stratton, Carmen Tafolla, Sergio Troncoso, Abraham Verghese, and Lawrence Wright.

The Lon Tinkle Award 

The Lon Tinkle Award is a life-achievement award bestowed annually to distinguished writers from, or in some way associated with, Texas. The honorees are chosen by the TIL Council from nominations made by the membership.

Winners

 1981:	Thomas C. Lea III (1907–2001)
 1982:	John Graves (born 1920)
 1983:	William A. Owens (1905–1990)
 1984:	Larry McMurtry (1936–2021)
 1985:	Donald Barthelme (1931–1989)
 1987:	Elmer Kelton (1926–2009)
 1987:	A.C. Greene (1923–2002)
 1988:	Charles Leland "Doc" Sonnichsen (1901–1991)
 1989:	John Edward Weems (1924–1999)
 1990:	Marshall Northway Terry, Jr. (born 1931)
 1991:	Margaret Cousins (1905–1996) 
 1992:	Vassar Miller (1924–1998) 
 1993:	Horton Foote (1916–2009) 
 1994:	Americo Paredes (1915–1999) 
 1995:	William Humphrey (1924–1997) 
 1996:	Cormac McCarthy (born 1933)
 1997:	Rolando Hinojosa-Smith (born 1929)
 1998:	Robert Flynn (born 1932)
 1999:	Walt McDonald (born 1934)
 2000:	Leon Hale (1921–2021)
 2001:	William H. Goetzmann (1930–2010) 
 2002:	Shelby Hearon (born 1931)
 2003:	Bud Shrake (1931–2009) 
 2004:	T. R. Fehrenbach (born 1925)
 2005:	James Martin Hoggard (born 1941)
 2006:	William D. Wittliff (born 1940)
 2007: David Joseph Weber (1940–2010) 
 2008:	Carolyn C. Osborn (born 1934)
 2009:	Larry L. King (1929–2012) †
 2011:	C.W. Smith (born 1940)
 2012:	Gary Cartwright (born 1934)
 2013:	Stephen Harrigan (born 1948)
 2014:	Jan Reid (born 1945)
 2015:	Lawrence Wright (born 1947)
 2016:	Sarah Bird (born 1949)
 2017:	Pat Mora (born 1942)
 2018:	Sandra Cisneros (born 1954)
 2019:	Naomi Shihab Nye (born 1952)
 2020:	John Rechy (born 1931)
 2021:	Benjamin Alire Sáenz (born 1954)
 2022: Celeste Bedford Walker

 † Beginning 2011, the award date reflects the actual date of the presentation. For instance, Larry King's 2009 award was actually presented in 2010.

References

External links
 Texas Institute of Letters
 Handbook of Texas Online: the Texas Institute of Letters

American writers' organizations
Arts organizations based in Texas
Texas literature
Arts organizations established in 1936
1936 establishments in Texas